The 1973 Championship of Australia was the 17th edition of the Championship of Australia, an ANFC-organised national club Australian rules football tournament between the champion clubs from the VFL, the SANFL, the WANFL and the Tasmanian State Premiership.

Qualified Teams

Venue
 Adelaide Oval (Capacity: 64,000)

Fixtures

Semi-finals

Third-place play-off

Championship of Australia final 

Championship of Australia
Championship of Australia
October 1973 sports events in Australia